Mary E. Grant (born January 10, 1953 in New Haven, Connecticut) is an American psychiatric nurse and politician who represented the 6th Essex district in the Massachusetts House of Representatives from 2003–2011. Prior to serving in the General Court, Grant served on the City Charter Commission, Ordinance Review Committee, and High School Site Council in Beverly, Massachusetts.

See also
 2003–2004 Massachusetts legislature
 2005–2006 Massachusetts legislature
 2007–2008 Massachusetts legislature
 2009–2010 Massachusetts legislature

References

External links
 

1953 births
Democratic Party members of the Massachusetts House of Representatives
Connell School of Nursing alumni
People from Beverly, Massachusetts
Living people
Women state legislators in Massachusetts